Kenneth Walter Davidson (born July 28, 1937) is a former political figure in British Columbia, Canada. He represented Delta in the Legislative Assembly of British Columbia from 1975 to 1991 as a Social Credit member.

He was born in Georgetown, Ontario, the son of David Douglas Davidson and Helen Tessman, and was educated in Welland and at the University of British Columbia. He was a city planner for Vancouver and a director for the Vancouver public library. Davidson lived in Delta. He was speaker for the assembly from 1982 to 1986.

References 
 

1937 births
Living people
Speakers of the Legislative Assembly of British Columbia
British Columbia Social Credit Party MLAs